Cham Darvahi (also Romanized as Cham Darvāhī; also known as Cham Darvāi and Cham Dowrāhī) is a village in Darvahi Rural District, Ab Pakhsh District, Dashtestan County, Bushehr Province, Iran. At the 2006 census, its population was 92, in 21 families.

References 

Populated places in Dashtestan County